NGC 6231 (also known as Caldwell 76) is an open cluster in the southern sky located half a degrees north of Zeta Scorpii. NGC 6231 is part of a swath of young, bluish stars in the constellation Scorpius known as the Scorpius OB1 association. The star Zeta1 (HR 6262) is a member of this association, while its brighter apparent partner, Zeta2 (HR 6271), is only 150 ly from Earth and so is not a member.

This cluster is estimated to be about 2–7 million years old, and is approaching the Solar System at 22 km/s. The cluster and association lie in the neighboring Sagittarius Arm of the Milky Way.  Zeta1 Scorpii (spectral type O8 and magnitude 4.71.) is the brightest star in the association, and one of the most radiant stars known in the galaxy. NGC 6231 was used to measure the binary fraction of B-type stars: 52 ± 8%, indicating that B-type stars are commonly found in binary systems, but not as commonly as in O-type stars.

NGC 6231 also includes three Wolf-Rayet stars: HD 151932, HD 152270, and HD 152408.

Discovery  
The cluster was discovered by Giovanni Batista Hodierna before 1654. Hodierna listed it as Luminosae in his catalogue of deep sky observations. This catalogue was included in his book De Admirandis Coeli Characteribuse published in 1654 at Palermo. It was independently observed by other astronomers after Hodierna, including Edmond Halley (1678), Jean-Philippe de Cheseaux (1745–46), and Abbe Lacaille (1751–52).

Common names 
The cluster forms the head of the False Comet, a wider collection of stars from Scorpius OB1 running northward from Zeta Scorpii and NGC 6231 roughly halfway toward Mu Scorpii. The tail is formed by two clusters, Collinder 316 and Trumpler 24. Trumpler 24 is surrounded by the emission nebula IC 4628, also known as the Prawn Nebula, where the tail appears to fan out.

The cluster is also sometimes known as The Northern Jewel Box, due to its similar appearance to the NGC 4755, the Jewel Box cluster, which is further south in the sky.

See also
 New General Catalogue

Notes

External links

 SEDS
 NGC 6231 at DOCdb (Deep Sky Observer's Companion)
 

Open clusters
6231
076b
Scorpius (constellation)